United States federal observances are days, weeks, months, or other periods designated by the United States Congress for the commemoration or other observance of various events, activities, or topics. These observances differ from federal holidays in that federal employees only receive a day free from work on holidays, not observances. Federal observances that are designated by Congress appear in Title 36 of the United States Code ( et seq.). Below is a list of all observances so designated. They are published at Pub. L. 105–225, Aug. 12, 1998, 112 Stat. 1256.; Pub. L. 105–225, Aug. 12, 1998, 112 Stat. 1261.; Pub. L. 105–225, Aug. 12, 1998, 112 Stat. 1262.; Pub. L. 107–89, § 1, Dec. 18, 2001, 115 Stat. 876.; and Pub. L. 114–240, § 2(a), Oct. 7, 2016, 130 Stat. 974..

The president may also declare selected federal observances by presidential proclamation. Those observances are referenced at the List of observances in the United States by presidential proclamation.

List of observances

Days

Weeks

Months

Other

References

External links
 National Health Observances , Office of Disease Prevention and Health Promotion, US Department of Health and Human Services. 
 
Federal government of the United States